The president of the Senate of Paraguay is the presiding officer in the Senate of Paraguay. The president is elected by the Senate of Paraguay for one-year term.

Presidents 1870 - 1940

Presidents after 1968
Below is a list of office-holders from 1968:

Sources

Website
The Senate of Paraguay's website

Senate, Presidents
Paraguay
Paraguay, Senate
List